The Mighty Sound of Maryland is the marching band of the University of Maryland. It was founded in 1908 at what was then known as the Maryland Agricultural College.  The band performs pregame, halftime, and fifth-quarter shows at all Maryland Terrapins home football games, and travels to at least one away game each year.

History

Early Years
For 50 years prior to 1909, the military-style college heard music by the Cadet Corps Drum and Buglers. Then, in 1909, the Maryland Agricultural College prevailed upon Mr. Levi G. Smith, a local violinist, to organize and conduct a band capable of playing for all formal ROTC functions. The result was a 19-piece band, which set up in the barracks behind present day South Campus Dining Hall. It played exclusively for ROTC functions for its first year, but later branched out to other school and community events. By 1927, three student bands were organized, and the bands were first recognized as an official student organization. In 1928, Sgt. Otto Siebeneichen, retired director of the U.S. Army Band, was appointed the first full-time director admitted to the faculty of the University of Maryland.

In 1924, the old football stadium was built. It occupied the location where Fraternity Row now stands. The stadium was razed in 1953 so that construction of Frat Row could begin. Women were allowed in the concert bands for the first time in 1937.

Mr. Frank V. Sykora, a graduate of the Imperial Russian Conservatory, directed the bands from 1947 to 1949. During his tenure, the size of the bands grew to over 100 members and began extensive traveling.

In 1950, the football arena, Byrd Stadium, opened with a win over Navy, and the band was fortunate to gain the guidance of Warrant Officer Robert L. Landers, the conductor of the "Singing Sergeants" as well as the Maryland Red and White Band.

The Music Department at Maryland was established in 1954, led by Homer Ulrich. The university hired Ulrich as the first full-time band director to be member of the music faculty.

Hubert Henderson, hired in 1955, established the band in the Music Department and integrated it as an ensemble (both marching and concert) in the music performance and music education programs. He was assisted by associate directors Norman Heim, Henry Romersa and Acton Ostling Jr.

Queen Elizabeth II visited the campus while touring the U.S. in 1957. Her visit was so important that the band was given $10,000 to purchase new uniforms to be used at the football game that she attended.

Henderson left in 1965 and Ostling became the director of bands. John Wakefield was hired to work with Ostling as associate director. When Ostling left in 1968, Wakefield became the director of bands. With the help of associate directors Fred Heath, Jerry Gardner, Dieter Zimmer and L. Richmond Sparks, Wakefield has led the band to be the superior ensemble it is today.

2000-2009

In August 2000, the bands moved from their old home of Tawes Fine Arts Building into the then-new Clarice Smith Performing Arts Center. In November of that year the Mighty Sound of Maryland marched in the Macy's Thanksgiving Day Parade in New York City. In September 2001, the new band room was dedicated to Mr. John E. Wakefield, Director of Bands.

During Early Week (band camp) of 2006, band director L. Richmond Sparks introduced the idea of a volunteer trip to New Orleans to the band.  The idea was met with much enthusiasm and excitement, and on September 9, 2006 the band played a New Orleans Tribute halftime show.  After finishing on the field, each member of the band took to the stands to collect donations in their shakos to help fund a service trip to New Orleans over winter break.  In the third quarter of the game over $25,000 was raised.  By the end of the semester, over $50,000 had been raised to fund the band's trip.  After a long bus ride, over 240 members of the band spent a week in New Orleans building houses with Habitat for Humanity at the Musicians' Village Project.  While in Louisiana, the band also performed for Habitat for Humanity volunteers, at Gallier Hall for the mayor, and at the Krewe of Alla's Mardi Gras kickoff parade in Gretna, Louisiana.

2010-Present
In 2010, the Mighty Sound of Maryland won CBS's Hawaii Five-0 theme song contest, gaining a prize of $25,000 for the band program. Part of their recorded performance of the theme was also aired on CBS during the show. The band was able to purchase new uniforms with their winnings.

The Mighty Sound of Maryland marched in the 2013 inauguration parade for President Barack Obama. The band was selected from over 2,800 other applicants and marked the fourth time they had participated in an inaugural parade.

In 2014, the Maryland Terrapins and the band joined the Big Ten Conference, home to bands widely considered to be some of the nation's finest. The bands directors expressed hope that the move would generate both additional exposure and funding for the band.

The Truck
During pre- and post-game parades, the Mighty Sound of Maryland performs a choreographed cheer and drum cadence known as "The Truck." Each section of the band writes their own lyrics and dances to The Truck, often cheering on the team and referencing the friendly rivalries between sections.

When the Terps win, band members wear their shakos backwards and the guard members hold their flags upside down while performing The Truck.

Pregame Show
The Mighty Sound of Maryland pregame show begins with a double-time Tunnel Entrance into a large block on the field. The band performs the Pregame Fanfare followed by the Victory Song while executing an eight-to-five march into the "Block M" formation. The band then turns backfield and performs the visiting team fight song towards the visiting team fans. The band then turns front field and performs The Star-Spangled Banner as a salute to the United States. After the Star-Spangled Banner, the Alma Mater is played.

Following the Alma Mater, MSOM performs "A Toast to Maryland" making the script "UM" on the field. This goes right into the band verbally cheering/spelling out "MARYLAND," then playing the Fight Song. The formation is the iconic "Script Terps" logo.

At the conclusion of the Fight Song, the band moves to a large block in the center of the field to execute the Mighty Sound of Maryland's double time technique to form a Terrapin shell on the field.

From the Terrapin shell, the band moves into an outline of the State of Maryland formation during the playing of Crown Imperial. Midway through the piece, the world's largest Maryland State Flag, measuring about 20 yards long, is unfurled by the Dance Team. The formation and flag are recognized as another hallmark of the Mighty Sound of Maryland pregame show.

Following Crown Imperial, the band moves under cadence to form a tunnel for the football team's entrance before exiting the field to play in the stands.

Stands
The band performs a number of school songs and popular pieces in the stands during the game. "The Victory Song", composed and written by Thornton W. Allen in the late 1920s, is played following successful field goals and extra points, while The Fight Song is played after a Maryland touchdown.

Mars, the Bringer of War is played during kickoffs.

The Bone Cheer is performed by KAOS, the trombone and baritone section, usually once per game. The cheer involves the section alone playing a song and the rest of the band yelling "Go! Fight! Win!" Once the cheer ends, the Tenor Sax Challenge begins, in which tenor saxophone players hold up their instruments from the base using only one hand for as long as they can. Another KAOS cheer is performing the Hallelujah Chorus from Handel's Messiah.

The band performs a number of popular pieces as well, with staples including Take On Me, Teenage Mutant Ninja Turtles, and Seven Nation Army.

Discontinued Traditions
The Amen Chorus was played at the end of victories, accompanied loudly by students and fans. It was considered a tradition unique to the University of Maryland. It was discontinued in the late 80's. The tradition was revived for one night only on January 11, 2017, while the band served as a pep band during a men's basketball game, in honor of Coach Lefty Driesell.

Rock and Roll Part II was played following touchdowns and other big plays to energize the crowd. Due to the student section's improvised lyrics - and the university's concerns about sportsmanship and its image - the band was forbidden from playing the song at all football and basketball games in 2004.

References

External links
 
 University of Maryland Band records at the University of Maryland Libraries

Big Ten Conference marching bands
University of Maryland, College Park
Musical groups established in 1908
University of Maryland, College Park student organizations
1908 establishments in Maryland